The Beriev Be-200 Altair is a utility amphibious aircraft designed and built by the Beriev Aircraft Company.

The name Altair was chosen after a competition amongst Beriev and Irkut staff in —2003, as a reference to the name of the alpha star in the Eagle constellation and because: "Al" is the first part of the name of the Beriev A-40 Albatross amphibious aircraft, whose layout was the development basis for the creation of the Be-200; "ta" stands for Taganrog; and "ir" stands for Irkutsk.

Development
Initiated in 1989 under the design leadership of Alexander Yavkin, to meet a perceived need for a civilian flying boat smaller than Beriev's military A-40, the Be-200 shares a similar layout to the A-40 but is about half the weight. Russian government approval for a purpose-designed water bomber was granted on 8 December 1990. Details of the project were announced, and a model displayed at the 1991 Paris Air Show.

In Perestroika-era Russia, Beriev needed funds to develop the new aircraft, and turned to the Irkutsk Aircraft Production Association (now part of the Irkut Corporation), which was looking to diversify into civilian projects, to help to develop and build the Be-200. Beriev was responsible for development, design and documentation; systems-, static-, flight- and fatigue-testing of prototypes; certification and support of the production models. Irkut's duties comprised production preparation; manufacture of tooling; production of four prototypes and production aircraft; and spare parts manufacture. Both companies now fall under the umbrella of the state-owned United Aircraft Corporation, which in turn is over 92% owned by Russia’s state-owned aviation giant Rostec.

Beriev developed unique fire-fighting equipment for the Be-200, allowing it to scoop water while skimming the water surface at 90-95% of takeoff speed. This system was developed using a specially modified Be-12P, coded '12 Yellow'. After installation of the fire-fighting system, the aircraft was registered RA-00046 and given the designation Be-12P-200. This modified Be-12 was used to develop both the fire-fighting system and methods of operation.

The Be-200's first flight from land was scheduled for 1997, but was eventually achieved by the first prototype aircraft on 24 September 1998. The aircraft was then transferred from Irkutsk to Taganrog after 26.5 flying hours, and the first take off from water was conducted on 10 September 1999 in Taganrog. The second Be-200 flew on August 27, 2002. This aircraft was built as a Be-200ES, being fitted to the specifications of the launch customer, EMERCOM, the Russian Ministry of Emergency Situations.

In 2001, as part of a marketing program, the Be-200 was displayed at two large exhibitions in the Pacific Ocean region; the International Maritime and Aerospace Exhibition LIMA'01 in Malaysia and the Korean Aerospace and Defence Exhibition KADE'01 in South Korea.

In 2002, the Be-200 participated in international aviation exhibitions, successfully demonstrating its capabilities to potential customers in France and Greece with 15 demonstration flights made from land, eight from water.

Irkut and EADS signed a memorandum of understanding in May 2002 to jointly carry out a market study and to define the conditions and costs of international certification and the logistics of setting up a worldwide after-sales service. The study was completed in July 2003, revealing a potential market for up to 320 aircraft over 20 years. The two companies, with Rolls-Royce Deutschland, planned to obtain Western certification during — and offer a Rolls-Royce BR715 powered aircraft for Western markets. This version was to be given the designation Be-200RR. The original Be-200 prototype (RF-21511) was earmarked to be converted into the Be-200RR prototype. However, efforts were discontinued toward a Rolls-Royce version since a joint study concluded in 2004 that because the intended BR715 engine would require extensive redevelopment due to weight and salt-water corrosion issues, break-even would require sales of too many aircraft.

The first of eight production aircraft was delivered to EMERCOM on July 31, 2003.  Seven other production-standard aircraft were then built between 2003 and 2011.  From this total of eight aircraft, EMERCOM got six and Azerbaijan one, with one aircraft (as well as the prototype) staying with the manufacturer.

In 2010, the decision was made to switch production to the Centre of competence for amphibian aircraft and flying boats in Taganrog. An assembly line was set up using tooling and equipment received from Irkut's main manufacturing site in Irkutsk, Siberia. This allowed the Irkut Corporation to concentrate on other more lucrative projects. Production of the Be-200 remained under the umbrella of the United Aircraft Corporation. The first Taganrog-built aircraft was delivered in early 2017.

In April 2018, months after Ukraine banned deliveries of Progress D-436 aircraft engines to Russia, Safran and UEC Saturn agreed to re-engine the Be-200 with the PowerJet SaM146 from the Sukhoi Superjet.  The hope was that the more-modern SaM146 engine, which passed international certification and complies with prospective ICAO requirements, would allow the aircraft to be more fully introduced to the European and American markets.  In April 2019, Russia's ministry of industry and trade objected to the Be-200ChS-146 project because the new engines contained components from NATO countries.  The project was apparently only suspended and not cancelled, though Russian certification of the re-engined aircraft was pushed to November 2021.  Regardless, western sanctions imposed in the wake of the 2022 Russian incursion into Ukraine prohibit sale, supply, transfer or export of aircraft and aircraft parts and technology to Russian entities.

Russian Prime Minister Mikhail Mishustin has called for state-owned Rostec to accelerate work on its PD-8 jet engine variant of the PD-14 engine, and for the PD-8 to be used on the Be-200 as well as the Irkut MC-21 narrow-body airliner.  That engine, including its automatic control system (called FADEC in the west), will be assembled from domestically-sourced materials and components and thus avoids any issue with regard to western sanctions or embargoes.  Certification is expected in 2023.  As of mid-2022, a PD-8 prototype had successfully completed ground testing, and flight testing on a flight test stand installed on an Ilyushin Il-76LL aircraft commenced December 26, 2022.  Mishustin in November 2022 announced investment of over 44 billion federal rubles in United Engine Corporation, and called for production of 50 PD-8 engines (among other types) within 2 years.

Design

The Be-200 is a high-wing T-tail monoplane. The hull is of single step design with a high length-to-beam ratio, which contributes to stability and controllability in water. The Be-200 airframe is constructed of aluminium alloys with corrosion-protection treatments. Selective use is made of titanium, composites and other corrosion-free materials. The wings are fitted with underwing stabiliser floats. The hydraulically operated retractable landing gear units all retract rearward, and each unit is twin-wheeled. A water rudder provides steering when in the water.

The aircraft is powered by two, over fuselage, pylon-mounted Progress D-436TP engines. The D-436TP is a specific "maritime" corrosion-resistant version of the D-436 three shaft turbofan engine, designed especially for the Be-200 amphibian, by Ivchenko Progress ZMKB and manufactured by Motor Sich in Ukraine. These are mounted above the wingroot pods on the landing gear fairings to prevent water spraying into the engines during take-off and landing.

The Digital Flight Control (fly-by-wire) cockpit is fitted with modern navigation systems such as satellite navigation, FMS, autopilot and weather radar. The ARIA 200-M all-weather integrated avionics system, developed by Honeywell with the Moscow Research Institute of Aircraft Equipment, uses six 152 x 203 mm (6 x 8 in) LCDs to display information to the crew of two.

The multirole Be-200 can be configured as an amphibious water drop fire-fighting aircraft, a freighter, or as a passenger aircraft—the pressurised and air conditioned cabin allowing transportation of up to 72 passengers. The Be-200 can also be equipped for special missions. When configured as an air ambulance, the aircraft can carry up to 30 stretcher patients and seven seated patients or medical crew. In the search and rescue role, the aircraft can be equipped with searchlights and sensors, an inflatable boat, thermal and optical surveillance systems, and medical equipment. The search and rescue variant can accommodate up to 45 people. The aircraft is also capable of being configured for anti-submarine warfare duties.

The Be-200 in amphibious water drop fire-fighter configuration suppresses fires by dropping water contained in eight ferric aluminium alloy water tanks, located under the cabin floor in the centre fuselage section. Alternatively, the tanks can be filled from a hydrant or a water cistern on the ground. The water tanks can be removed quickly for carrying cargo. Water can be dropped in a single salvo, or in up to eight consecutive drops. The aircraft can empty its water tanks over the site of a fire in 0.8 to 1.0 seconds when flying above the minimum drop speed of

Operational history

For this period a Be-200ES was operated from Sardinia (Italy) by SOREM, the official operator of fire-fighting equipment of Italian Civil Defense Department (Protezione Civile). The aircraft, flown by joint Russian-Italian flight crew performed more than 100 flights with about 90 hours flown. During seven hours of operational flights, the aircraft participated in the extinguishing of four forest fires and dropped .

The partnership was renewed in 2005, with Be-200ES based at Sardinia between July and September. The aircraft flew 150 hours covering 63 missions, including ferry flights, and 435 scoops and drops of water, the total mass of which exceeded .

In 2006, aircraft was again leased by the Portuguese Fire Fighting Services (SNBPC – Serviço Nacional de Bombeiros e Protecção Civil) for evaluation during the forest fire season. On 6 July 2006, the Russian crew of the Be-200 leased by Portugal were carrying out a water pick-up from the Aguieira dam near Santa Comba Dão, when on climbing away they clipped treetops and at least one of the Progress D-436TP engines suffered ingestion damage and had to be shut down. The aircraft recovered safely to land at Monte Real air force base, from which it had been operating. After repairs, the aircraft completed the season in Portugal. In total, 42 flights were performed during operations in Portugal, with a total flying time of 119 hours. The aircraft performed 301 water scooping operations and dropped  of water on fires.

In October 2006, two Be-200ES ( and ) were leased to Indonesia by EMERCOM, fighting fires for 45 days. Beriev, however has not confirmed these reports.

During this period 58 fire-fighting flights were conducted with a total flying time of over 167 hours. 
 of water was dropped. Beriev claims that representatives of the newly formed Portuguese government enterprise EMA (Empresa de Meios Aéreos) have expressed their interest in a long-term cooperation with Beriev and the Be-200 in Portugal.

In April 2008, Azerbaijan became the first foreign customer for the Be-200, purchasing one Be-200ES from Russia. The aircraft (formerly  ) is operated by the Azerbaijan Ministry of Emergency Situations and can be operated as a fire-fighting, cargo and 43-seater passenger aircraft.

In July—August 2010 it was used in Russia during the wildfires that spread across the country.

In early December 2010, two Be-200ES aircraft were used to fight the 2010 Mount Carmel forest fire near Haifa, Israel.

In Serbia one Be-200 belonging to Russian Ministry of Emergency Situations is stationed in summer on Niš Constantine the Great Airport. Aircraft has already operational history in 2012 and 2013.

A Be-200 was dispatched by Russia in January 2015 to assist in search and recovery operations following the loss of Indonesia AirAsia Flight 8501 in the Java Sea. On October 20, 2015, two Be-200s were used by the Indonesian government to fight a forest fire in Sumatra.

In August 2016 two Be-200 aircraft were sent to Portugal after being asked for help in extinguishing forest fires. Four days later it was reported that thanks to the work of the Russian Emergencies Ministry Be-200 pilots, the fire was prevented from spreading in the direction of two settlements: Castro Laboreiro with a population of 1,000 people, and Viaden de Baixo, where 15 farms were saved from fire, and Peneda-Gerês National Park.

A Chinese entity called Leader Energy Aircraft Manufacturing Co. ordered two Be-200s, with an option for two more, at the Zhuhai Airshow in 2016. The contract was signed in June 2017. At that time, there was talk by the Director General of the Taganrog facility of moving production entirely to China.

A firm called International Emergency Services ("IES"), housed at the Santa Maria Public Airport in California, tried since at least 2009 to bring the Be-200 to the United States in its fire-fighting role.  An organisation called the USA Firefighting Air Corps ("USAFAC") said in September 2014 that it had signed a collaboration agreement with IES to develop a U.S.-built Be-200 in Colorado. However, the USAFAC website address was simply parked by late 2021, and the Colorado Secretary of State records show USAFAC has expired. There was also discussion at a Santa Maria Public Airport District meeting in October 2016 of IES, Seaplane Global Air Services ("SGAS") and Airbus partnering to build the aircraft at the Santa Maria airport.  Regardless, there was no concrete on-the-ground result from this proposal.  Meanwhile, in September 2018, SGAS ordered from the manufacturer four Be-200ES aircraft with an option for six more. The first two aircraft were to be equipped with D-436TP engines, the eight others with the SaM146 engines. According to some reports, SGAS had plans to wet- and dry-lease the water-bombers in partnership with IES, offering services in several countries, including the US, European nations, and Australia. However, as of March 2022, the IES website address leads only to a page marked: “Account Suspended,” and the California Secretary of State website shows International Emergency Services as terminated.

In June–October 2020, Be-200ESs were extensively used to provide fire-fighting service in Turkey. During the summer of 2021 one aircraft was used in Greece.

On August 8, 2021, a Be-200 was leased by Turkey from Russia to participate in the fight against the 2021 Turkish wildfires arrived in Turkey. On August 14, it crashed near the city of Adana, killing all 8 personnel on board including 5 Russian servicemen and 3 Turkish citizens.

The Greek government in 2022 began planning to address the upcoming fire season without use of any Be-200 aircraft.

In February 2023 the EMERCOM dispatched a Be-200 to extinguish a large fire at the Turkish Iskenderun port, which began after a powerful earthquake hit Turkey and Syria.

Variants

Be-200 Basic multirole model
Be-200ChS/Be-200ES Multirole model fitted to the requirements of the Russian Ministry of Emergency Situations
Be-200E English cockpit version of the Be-200ES
Be-200RR Projected Rolls-Royce engined variant, since shelved
Be-210 Projected passenger-only model
Be-220 Projected maritime patrol variant
Be-200ChS-146 Projected SaM146-powered variant, since shelved because the Russian war against Ukraine shut off the supply of SaM146 engine parts from French-based manufacturer Safran.

Operators

 Algerian Ministry of Defence – 1 Be-200ES Finished and being used for training, from a total of 4 Be-200s on order with the option for 2 or 4 more.

 Ministry of Emergency Situations – 1 Be-200ES in inventory.

 Ministry of Emergency Situations – ordered 8 Be-200ESs in 2010. It had 12 Be-200ESs in inventory with 7 flight-worthy and ordered 2 more as of December 2020.
 Ministry of Defence – ordered 3 Be-200s in 2018. The first one was delivered in 2020.

Future operators

 Asesorias CBP Ltda – 2 Be-200s on order and 5 options.  Deliveries were expected in 2020.  As of 2023, an article on the company’s website from March of 2019 indicates two Be-200 aircraft "will arrive" in Chile in 2021, but nothing on the website suggests the aircraft were actually ever delivered.

 Leader Energy Aircraft Manufacturing Co. – 2 Be-200s on order and 2 options.

 Seaplane Global Air Services – 4 Be-200ESs on order and 6 options (the first 2 on order with D-436TP engines, all others with the SaM146 engines).  The agreement provides for deliveries to begin 15 months after the financing starts, and the financing was anticipated in September 2019. Deliveries were expected to start in late 2020 and continue into 2021; however, Russian certification of the SaM146-powered aircraft is now not anticipated before November 2021.

Specifications (Be-200)

See also

Notes

References

Bibliography

External links

 Beriev (Aircraft Designer) Official Site
 Irkut (Aircraft Manufacturer) Official Site
 EADS-Irkut Seaplane (Aircraft Sales & Marketing Partners) Official Site
 RussiaToday: Spotlight - Be-200—Russia's aviation breakthrough—An interview with Oleg Demchenko, President of the Irkut Aviation Corporation, about the Be-200, its lack of European sales, and the state of the Russian aviation industry.
 "Mixing Fire and Water"—a 1998 Flight article on the Beriev BE-200
 Beriev, Be-200 Multipurpose amphibian aircraft
 Russia to create several Be-200 amphibious aircraft units, August 2020

Aerial firefighting aircraft
Amphibious aircraft
Be-0200
Engine-over-wing aircraft
Flying boats
High-wing aircraft
T-tail aircraft
Jet seaplanes and flying boats
1990s Soviet and Russian civil utility aircraft
Twinjets
Aircraft first flown in 1998